Unity Sickles Phelan (born February 1995) is an American ballet dancer. She joined the New York City Ballet in 2013 and was promoted to principal dancer in 2021. Outside of the company, she had also danced in films John Wick: Chapter 3 – Parabellum and I'm Thinking of Ending Things.

Early life and training
Phelan was born in Princeton, New Jersey. Her father founded a health service company, where he was also the chief executive, and her mother is an accountant. Phelan explained that her parents liked the idea of "unity", hence her unusual first name.

Phelan started ballet at age four at Princeton Ballet School, following her older sister. At thirteen, she attended the summer program at the School of American Ballet in New York, and was invited to join the year-round program. Her parents thought she was too young, but allowed her to train there full-time the following year. She trained at the school for three years. During this time, she also completed high school at the Professional Children's School, and graduated in 2012.

Career
Phelan became an apprentice with the New York City Ballet in 2012, and joined the corps de ballet the following year. Roles she danced whilst in the corps de ballet include in Balanchine's "Stairway to Paradise" in Who Cares?, Episodes, first pas de trois in Agon and a demi-soloist in Symphony in Three Movements.  In 2015, she made her debut as the Sugar Plum Fairy in Balanchine's The Nutcracker. In 2016, she was chosen by choreographer Christopher Wheeldon to create a lead role in American Rhapsody, and by Lauren Lovette in For Clara. Later that year, she debuted as Dewdrop in The Nutcracker. The following year, she originated a role in Pontus Lidberg's The Shimmering Asphalt.

Phelan was promoted to soloist in 2017. Since then, she has danced featured roles, including in "Emerald" from Jewels, A Midsummer Night's Dream, Liebeslieder Walzer, Orpheus, Divertimento No. 15; Robbins' Dances at a Gathering, In G Major and Antique Epigraphs; Wheeldon's Polyphonia and DGV: Danse à Grande Vitesse; and Forsythe's Herman Schmermen. She has also created roles in Peck's Easy, Lovette's The Shaded Line and Ratmansky's Voices.

In 2017, she performed a pas de deux in Balanchine's Agon with then-American Ballet Theatre soloist Calvin Royal III, with Arthur Mitchell, who originated Royal's role, in the audience. Following the performance, Mitchell commented the ballet was "in good hands." The following year, after Mitchell's death, Royal and Phelan reprised the Agon pas de deux at his memorial. The same year, following the collaboration between New York City Ballet and Puma, she took part in the latter's promotional tour in Asia.

Phelan appeared in the 2019 film, John Wick: Chapter 3 – Parabellum, as a ballerina who is also training to be an assassin, with the dance sequences choreographed by Tiler Peck. She then appeared in a dream ballet sequence in the 2020 film, I'm Thinking of Ending Things, choreographed by Peter Walker. In 2020, she was featured in a campaign for Gabriela Hearst. Later that year, she danced in Andrea Miller's short film, New Song, which was made for the New York City Ballet.

In 2021, Phelan was promoted to principal dancer. Her promotion came soon after the company return to performing after the COVID-19 pandemic, as well as multiple principal dancers' retirements. Ballets she performed since her promotion include Balanchine's Agon, Tschaikovsky Pas de Deux, Apollo (as Terpsichore), Symphony in C, Stravinsky Violin Concerto, Vienna Waltzes, La Sonnambula (as the Sleepwalker), A Midsummer Night's Dream (as Titania), Swan Lake, and Robbins' Piano Pieces. In 2022, she originated a role in Roberts' Emanon — in Two Movements.

Personal life
While dancing full-time, Phelan also studied at Fordham University. She graduated in 2020, with a bachelor's degree in economics and organizational leadership.

In 2022, Phelan married Cameron Dieck, a former New York City Ballet dancer.

Notes

References

External links

1995 births
Living people
People from Princeton, New Jersey
American ballerinas
New York City Ballet principal dancers
School of American Ballet alumni
Fordham University alumni
Dancers from New Jersey
21st-century American ballet dancers
21st-century American women